Heinz Otto Ziegler (1903–1944) was a Czech political scientist, who became an RAF pilot. He was killed in action in May 1944.

Career
Ziegler wrote his doctoral dissertation for Heidelberg University in 1925  Die Bedeutung des geltenden Wahlverfahrens für die politische Struktur Deutschlands (The importance of the current election process for the political structure of Germany)  
 
In the interval, he  published Die moderne Nation. Ein Beitrag zur politischen Soziologie. (The modern nations: an account of political sociology), published by Mohr in  Tübingen, 1931, and still held in most major research libraries.  The work was reviewed in  several academic journals.  
Subsequently, he published  Autoritärer oder totaler Staat. (Authoritarian or total State) Tübingen: Mohr, 1932  and  Die berufliche und soziale Gliederung der Bevölkerung in der Tschechoslowakei.  (The professional and social structure of the population in Czechoslovakia.) Brünn: Rudolf M. Rohrer, 1936.

Personal life
He was born to Alice and Ernst Ziegler, a wealthy Lutheran banker of Jewish descent. They later died after being interned in the Theresienstadt concentration camp. Heinz Ziegler escaped to England with his two brothers Paul and Hans where he was given a false identity and joined the RAF. He had a son Toby Eady with the English author Mary Wesley, who worked for MI5 during the war.

References

1903 births
1944 deaths
Czechoslovak Royal Air Force pilots of World War II
Czech Jews
Czech political scientists
Royal Air Force personnel killed in World War II
20th-century political scientists